XHTOL-FM is a radio station in Ixtlahuaca, State of Mexico. Broadcasting on 102.9 FM, XHTOL is owned by Grupo ACIR and carries its Radio Felicidad Spanish oldies format.

History

XEDV-AM 1550 received its concession on April 23, 1969. Located in El Oro, it was owned by José Santillan Ramírez. In the 1980s, XEDV moved to 1430 and became XEXOO-AM. It was known as La Voz de El Oro. In 1994, Grupo ACIR bought XEXOO and moved it to serve the Toluca area on 1130 kHz as XETOL-AM.

It migrated to FM in 2011. In 2019, the station converted from the La Comadre grupera format to Radio Felicidad.

References

Radio stations in the State of Mexico
Grupo ACIR